John Vanderlyn (October 18, 1775September 23, 1852) was an American neoclassicist painter.

Biography

Vanderlyn was born at Kingston, New York, and was the grandson of colonial portrait painter Pieter Vanderlyn. He was employed by a print-seller in New York, and was first instructed in art by Archibald Robinson (1765–1835), a Scotsman who was afterwards one of the directors of the American Academy of the Fine Arts. He went to Philadelphia, where he spent time in the studio of Gilbert Stuart and copied some of Stuart's portraits, including one of Aaron Burr, who placed him under Gilbert Stuart as a pupil.

He was a protégé of Aaron Burr who in 1796 sent Vanderlyn to Paris, where he studied for five years.  He returned to the United States in 1801 and lived in the home of Burr, then the Vice President, where he painted the well-known portraits of Burr and his daughter. In 1802 he painted two views of Niagara Falls, which were engraved and published in London in 1804. He returned to Paris in 1803, also visiting England in 1805, where he painted the Death of Jane McCrea for Joel Barlow. Vanderlyn then went to Rome, where he painted his picture of Marius amid the Ruins of Carthage, which was shown in Paris, and obtained the Napoleon gold medal there. This success caused him to remain in Paris for seven years, during which time he prospered greatly. In 1812 he showed a nude Ariadne (engraved by Durand, and now in the Pennsylvania Academy), which increased his fame. When Aaron Burr fled to Paris, Vanderlyn was for a time his only support.

Vanderlyn returned to the United States in 1815, and painted portraits of various eminent men, including James Monroe, John C. Calhoun, Governor Joseph C. Yates, Governor George Clinton, James Madison, Robert R Livingston (New York Historical Society), Andrew Jackson, and Zachary Taylor. In 1834, he completed a posthumous full-length portrait of George Washington for the U.S. House of Representatives, based on Gilbert Stuart's 1796 Lansdowne portrait.
 
He also exhibited panoramas and built The Rotunda in New York City, which displayed panoramas of Paris, Athens, Mexico, Versailles (by himself), and some battle-pieces; but neither his portraits nor the panoramas brought him financial success, partly because he worked very slowly.

In 1825 Vanderlyn was one of the founders of the National Academy of Design, and taught at its school.

In 1842, through friendly influences, he was commissioned by Congress to paint The Landing of Columbus for the Rotunda of the United States Capitol. Going to Paris, he hired a French artist, who, it is said, did most of the work. It was engraved for the United States five-dollar banknotes. This painting was later reproduced in an engraving used on the Columbian 2c Postage Issue of 1893.

Vanderlyn was the first American to study in France instead of in England, and to acquire accurate draughtsmanship. He was more academic than his fellows; but, though faithfully and capably executed, it was thought that his work was rather devoid of charm, according to the 1911 Encyclopædia Britannica. His Landing of Columbus has been called by Appleton's Cyclopedia "hardly more than respectable."
He died in poverty at Kingston, New York, on September 23, 1852. He is buried in Wiltwyck Rural Cemetery in Kingston, NY.

Gallery

Notes

References

Further reading

External links

 City of Kingston, New York, Web pages on John Vanderlyn.
  Study for Landing of Columbus at the Birmingham Museum of Art

1775 births
1852 deaths
American people of Dutch descent
American neoclassical painters
18th-century American painters
18th-century American male artists
American male painters
19th-century American painters
19th-century American male artists
People from Kingston, New York
Painters from New York (state)
National Academy of Design faculty
National Academy of Design members
American history painters